Creekvale is an unincorporated community in Hampshire County in the U.S. state of West Virginia. Creekvale is located southeast of Levels along the Little Cacapon River on Little Cacapon-Levels Road (West Virginia Secondary Route 3/3). Creekvale had a post office  in operation from 1918 to 1935.

References 

Unincorporated communities in Hampshire County, West Virginia
Unincorporated communities in West Virginia